Tianhe is a town in Luocheng Mulao Autonomous County, Guangxi, China.

Administrative division
As of 2021, the town is divided into one community and fourteen villages: 
Tianhe Community
Gubang
Bairen
Jiaquan
Jinxin
Huazhang
Diaoshui
Tunxiang
Weixin
Beihua
Jinxing
Jincheng
Bei'an
Jicheng
Shangchao

History
The region historically known as "Tianhe County" in ancient times.

It was controlled by the People's Liberation Army (PLA) on 11 February 1950 and came under the jurisdiction of Yishan Special District. Tianhe County was revoked on 23 April 1953 and merged into Luocheng County. In 1958, it was renamed "Tianhe People's Commune". It was incorporated as a township in 1984 and was upgraded to a town in August 1992.

Geography
The town is situated at the west of Luocheng Mulao Autonomous County. It is surrounded by Qiaoshan Township on the north, Huaiqun Town on the west, Siba Town on the east, and Yizhou District on the south.

The Xiaolong River flows through the town.

Climate

Economy
The economy of the town is strongly based on agriculture, including farming and pig-breeding. The main crops are rice and corn. Economic crops are mainly rapeseed and vegetable.

Demographics

The 2019 census showed the town's population to be 22,788, a decrease of −1.6% from the 2011 census.

References

Bibliography

 

Divisions of Luocheng Mulao Autonomous County